The Big Area is the second album by English rock band Then Jerico, released in 1989. It includes three singles which reached the UK top 40: "Big Area" (No. 13; the band's biggest single to date), "What Does It Take" (featuring backing vocals by Belinda Carlisle; No. 33) and "Sugar Box" (No. 22). The album reached No. 4 in the UK Albums Chart.

Track listing
All tracks written by Then Jerico (lyrics by Mark Shaw), except where noted.

Note
Track 10 not available on some formats of the album.

Personnel
Adapted from album liner notes and AllMusic.
John Brough – engineer
Paul Buckmaster – string arrangements
Belinda Carlisle – background vocals ("What Does It Take")
Rhett Davies – producer
Robert Downes – guitar
Peter Henderson – engineer, producer
Charles Judge – keyboards
Bruce Lampcov – producer
Gary Langan – producer
Rick Nowels – producer
Mark Shaw – producer, vocals
Jason Stainthorpe – bass guitar
Stuart – performer, primary artist
Richard Sullivan – engineer
Scott Taylor – rhythm guitar, performer, primary artist
Then Jerico – primary artist
Steve Wren – drums, percussion
Chris Youdell – keyboards

References

External links
The Big Area at Discogs

1989 albums
Then Jerico albums
London Records albums
MCA Records albums
Albums produced by Rhett Davies
Albums produced by Rick Nowels
Albums recorded at RAK Studios
Albums recorded at Sunset Sound Recorders